In chemistry, disproportionation, sometimes called dismutation, is a redox reaction in which one compound of intermediate oxidation state converts to two compounds, one of higher and one of lower oxidation states.  More generally, the term can be applied to any desymmetrizing reaction of the following type, regardless of whether it is a redox or some other type of process:
2A -> A' + A''

Examples
Mercury(I) chloride disproportionates upon UV-irradiation:
Hg2Cl2 → Hg + HgCl2

Phosphorous acid disproportionates upon heating to give phosphoric acid and phosphine:
4  →  3 H3PO4 + PH3

Desymmetrizing reactions are sometimes referred to as disproportionation, as illustrated by the thermal degradation of bicarbonate:
2  →  + H2CO3
The oxidation numbers remain constant in this acid-base reaction.  This process is also called autoionization.

Another variant on disproportionation is radical disproportionation, in which two radicals form an alkene and an alkane.
{2CH3-\underset{^\bullet}CH2 -> {H2C=CH2} + H3C-CH3}

Reverse reaction
The reverse of disproportionation, such as when a compound in an intermediate oxidation state is formed from precursors of lower and higher oxidation states, is called comproportionation, also known as synproportionation.

History
The first disproportionation reaction to be studied in detail was:

2 Sn2+ → Sn4+ + Sn

This was examined using tartrates by Johan Gadolin in 1788. In the Swedish  version of his paper he called it 'söndring'.

Further examples 
Chlorine gas reacts with dilute sodium hydroxide to form sodium chloride, sodium chlorate and water. The ionic equation for this reaction is as follows:3Cl2 + 6 OH- -> 5 Cl- + ClO3- + 3 H2O
The chlorine reactant is in oxidation state 0. In the products, the chlorine in the Cl− ion has an oxidation number of −1, having been reduced, whereas the oxidation number of the chlorine in the ClO3− ion is +5, indicating that it has been oxidized.
Decompositions of numerous interhalogen compounds involve disproportionation. Bromine fluoride undergoes disproportionation reaction to form bromine trifluoride and bromine:3 BrF -> BrF3 + Br2
The dismutation of superoxide free radical to hydrogen peroxide and oxygen, catalysed in living systems by the enzyme superoxide dismutase: 2 O2- + 2H+ -> H2O2 + O2 The oxidation state of oxygen is −1/2 in the superoxide free radical anion, −1 in hydrogen peroxide and 0 in dioxygen.
In the Cannizzaro reaction, an aldehyde is converted into an alcohol and a carboxylic acid. In the related Tishchenko reaction, the organic redox reaction product is the corresponding ester. In the Kornblum–DeLaMare rearrangement, a peroxide is converted to a ketone and an alcohol.
The disproportionation  of hydrogen peroxide into water and oxygen catalysed by either potassium iodide or the enzyme catalase: 2 H2O2 -> 2 H2O + O2
In the Boudouard reaction, carbon monoxide disproportionates to carbon and carbon dioxide. The reaction is for example used in the HiPco method for producing carbon nanotubes, high-pressure carbon monoxide disproportionates when catalysed on the surface of an iron particle: 2 CO -> C + CO2
Nitrogen has oxidation state +4 in nitrogen dioxide, but when this compound reacts with water, it forms both nitric acid and nitrous acid, where nitrogen has oxidation states +5 and +3 respectively: 2NO2 + H2O -> HNO3 + HNO2
Dithionite undergoes acid hydrolysis to thiosulfate and bisulfite:  2 {S2O4^{2-}} + H2O -> {S2O3^{2-}} + 2 HSO3- 
Dithionite also undergoes alkaline hydrolysis to sulfite and sulfide: 3 Na2S2O4 + 6 NaOH -> 5 Na2SO3 + Na2S + 3 H2O
Dithionate is prepared on a larger scale by oxidizing a cooled aqueous solution of sulfur dioxide with manganese dioxide: 2 MnO2 + 3 SO2 -> MnS2O6 + MnSO4

Polymer chemistry 
In free-radical chain-growth polymerization, chain termination can occur by a disproportionation step in which a hydrogen atom is transferred from one growing chain molecule to another which produces two dead (non-growing) chains.
-------CH2–C°HX  +  -------CH2–C°HX  →  -------CH=CHX  +  -------CH2–CH2X

Biochemistry 
In 1937, Hans Adolf Krebs, who discovered the citric acid cycle bearing his name, confirmed the anaerobic dismutation of pyruvic acid into lactic acid, acetic acid and CO2 by certain bacteria according to the global reaction:

2 pyruvic acid + H2O → lactic acid + acetic acid + CO2

The dismutation of pyruvic acid in other small organic molecules (ethanol + CO2, or lactate and acetate, depending on the environmental conditions) is also an important step in fermentation reactions. Fermentation reactions can also be considered as disproportionation or dismutation biochemical reactions. Indeed, the donor and acceptor of electrons in the redox reactions supplying the chemical energy in these complex biochemical systems are the same organic molecules simultaneously acting as reductant or oxidant.

Another example of biochemical dismutation reaction is the disproportionation of acetaldehyde into ethanol and acetic acid.

While in respiration electrons are transferred from substrate (electron donor) to an electron acceptor, in fermentation part of the substrate molecule itself accepts the electrons. Fermentation is therefore a type of disproportionation, and does not involve an overall change in oxidation state of the substrate. Most of the fermentative substrates are organic molecules. However, a rare type of fermentation may also involve the disproportionation of inorganic sulfur compounds in certain sulfate-reducing bacteria.

See also 
 Comproportionation
Dismutase
 Oxidoreductase
 Fermentation (biochemistry)
 Citric acid cycle

References 

Chemical reactions
Chemical processes
Organic reactions
Biochemistry